Micajah Pond is a  pond located in Plymouth, Massachusetts. The Micajah Heights neighborhood surrounds the southeastern portion of the pond and Little Micajah Pond. Shenandoah Estates borders the northern portion of the pond known as the lily pond and wraps around the pond bordered by Goldfinch Lane. Boat access is on the southeastern shore of the pond.

External links
MassWildlife - Pond Maps
Micajah Pond Forum and Home Page

Ponds of Plymouth, Massachusetts
Ponds of Massachusetts